Victorian Halls are an American alternative rock band originating from Chicago, Illinois, United States.

History
Chicago trio Victorian Halls  (originally quartet, before Carlos Luna leaving the band in 2011 following the second fall tour shortly after the release of their first studio album), headed by the lead singer Sean Lenart, have been playing the Chicago underground music scene for years before they recorded their first two records, EP "Springteen" (2007) and the self-titled 'Octo' EP "Victorian Halls" (2010), both as self-releases. The third EP, "Crystal Lenses" (2011) was already recorded and pressed, but subsequently shelved, due to the group getting signed-up to Victory Records prior to its release.

Band's debut studio album titled "Charlatan" was released on Victory Records in August 2011. The album was recorded in Los Angeles in Cameron Webb's recording studio.

Their second full-length studio album, "Hyperalgesia" was recorded in Gossip Studios, Chicago and released in May 2015  with help of prolific music producer and mixer Joe Chiccarelli, who has in the past produced dozens of albums for well-known acts and singers (The Strokes, The Killers, U2, Jason Mraz). The band promoted the material from their new release on their “All My Friends Are Dead” Tour  (name taken from the lyrics of the first track of the album “All My Friends”) throughout September 2016.

In November 2015 the group released a Christmas-themed song titled “This Holiday”.

The group tours regularly, since 2006 performing yearly and playing more than 85 concerts  at multiple venues across the US, either headlining as a main act or, mainly prior 2010, appearing as a supporting band. The band's latest tour was a string of SouthEast US shows staged between 3–11 May 2017.

The remix of their own song "Glass Depth Mood" titled "So Ambitious (GDM Remix)" was included in the soundtrack for the video game Watch Dogs.

Musical style

While the group's first major release, Charlatan, was dominated by rough, punk-rock-like tunes, underlined by Sean Lenart's distinctive, shrill vocals (described by one of the critics as "having reached the heights other lead singers don't even know they exist"), the following studio album, Hyperalgesia, while maintaining the overall characteristic experimental-rock feel  of Victorian Halls' music, is a much more mature-rock affair with many great, original songs, that however (perhaps with the exception of the track "Most Firearms Are More Than Adequate in Killing an Undead Brain") lack that unmistakable, fresh roughness of the debut album.

Members
Present
Sean Lenart - lead vocals/lead guitar/piano (2006–present)
Jordan Dismuke - bass guitar (2011–present)
Michael Tomala - drums (2006–present)

Live
Phil Battaglia - drums/backing vocals (2015–present)
Luke Harvey - lead guitar (2015)

Former
Carlos Luna – electronic keyboard, vocals (2006–2011)

Discography

Studio

EP

Singles

Music Videos

References

External links
 Victorian Halls official website
 Victorian Halls on Facebook
 Victorian Halls on Victory Records

American alternative rock groups
Victory Records artists